In the Fishtank 13 features Solex and the Maarten Altena Ensemble

Track listing
 5 Superstar
 Go Easy On The Fun Fund
 1 + 1 = 11
 Birthday Superboy

References

External links
Konkurrent

13
2005 EPs
Solex (musician) albums
Split EPs
Konkurrent EPs